The San Luigi Gonzaga is a Roman Catholic church located in the rural neighborhood of Corteranzo near the town of Murisengo in the Province of Alessandria in the region of Piedmont, Italy. The small church was designed in 1738 by the prominent Piedmontese architect Bernardo Vittone.

History and Description
The erection of a small church at this rural location, presumably to replace a small chapel or hermitage, was patronized by Tommaso Giunipero, an aristocrat residing in the Villa of Corteranzo. Documents suggest plans began in early 18th-century but only completed in 1760, posthumously using designs of Vittone. While the exterior appears somewhat rusticated with worn brick, the interior has a complex hexagonal cupola.

References

Roman Catholic churches completed in 1760
18th-century Roman Catholic church buildings in Italy
Churches in the province of Alessandria
Bernardo Antonio Vittone buildings
Baroque church buildings in Piedmont
Church buildings with domes